Mark Joseph is an American multimedia producer, author, and founder/CEO of MJM Entertainment Group and Bully! Pulpit. He lives in the Los Angeles area with his wife and children.

Early life and education

Joseph was born in Tokyo, Japan and after graduating from the Christian Academy in Japan in 1986 moved to Los Angeles to attend Biola University, graduating with a bachelor's degree in communication in 1990.

Early career & TV
While in college in 1988, Joseph founded MJM Entertainment Group, coordinating recording sessions for Japanese bands and producing documentaries for Japanese TV networks NTV, NHK, and Fuji TV.  Joseph has worked steadily as a TV talk show host and correspondent for a variety of media outlets. In 1992 when the co-host of the Group W broadcast, The Wow Wow Entertainment Report, decided to take a sabbatical to star in a film, Joseph was chosen to fill in on a temporary basis. What was to have been a two-month engagement turned into a full-time position when the network appointed Joseph as co-anchor of the broadcast. Soon afterward, the program was acquired by CNN and Joseph continued to anchor the program for CNN. In 1994 the show was not renewed and Joseph turned his attention to creating a pilot for a culturally relevant political/pop culture talk show for CNN called Culture Clash which he hosted and produced. Although the show was not picked up, later that year Joseph began producing and hosting another talk show for Japan's NHK Network called The Interview. Set in Los Angeles, the program featured one on one interviews with American cultural icons like CNN's Larry King, providing a window into American society for millions of Asian viewers. After three successful seasons, the show was re-christened LA Frontline and ran for two additional seasons. Joseph continues to host and produce talk shows, most recently the Bully! Pulpit show, an online talk show that features Joseph interviewing newsmakers for his news blog site, Bullypulpit.com

Film
From 2000–2005, he worked in development and marketing for Walden Media and Crusader Entertainment where he served as a special consultant to the presidents of both companies. Joseph worked in the areas of development, marketing and music and oversaw a nine-member marketing team which marketed Walden/Crusader films like Holes, Because of Winn Dixie, I Am David, Joshua, Children on Their Birthdays and others. In 2001, Joseph co-founded the Damah Film Festival, a short film festival whose mission is to "encourages an emerging generation of filmmakers from diverse perspectives to voice the spiritual aspect of the human experience through film and provides a forum for these artists to develop, discuss and display their vision" and serves as president of the board of directors. In 2004 Joseph produced two short films, The Bridge and Cupid with co-producer Ralph Winter. His recent film productions include Reagan, Doonby, and IX. He recently produced the documentary No Safe Spaces, which features Dennis Prager and Adam Corolla.

Music
Joseph is also an award-winning record producer who has worked with artists like Lauryn Hill, P.O.D., Switchfoot, Lifehouse, Sixpence None The Richer, Scott Stapp of Creed, MxPx, Dr. John, ZZ Top, Blink 182, Kirk Franklin, Yolanda Adams, Andrae Crouch, and others and in 2004 produced the rock soundtrack for The Passion of the Christ. He began his career in 1988 as a production coordinator for Japanese artists recording their records in the U.S. and in 1990 began distributing recordings by American artists into the Japanese market. In 2008 he launched Bully! Pulpit Records, a joint-venture label with Nettwerk Music Group. The label's first artist, Molly Jenson, released her first CD, "Maybe Tomorrow" in March 2009. Joseph is producing the debut record of a band he discovered, The Kilns.

Author, columnist & publisher
Joseph is an author and regular columnist for The Huffington Post, USA Today  and Foxnews.com.  He has contributed to a variety of publications including The Hollywood Reporter, Variety, Billboard,, Forbes, Investor's Business Daily, Beliefnet, Political Mavens, Townhall.com, National Review, and others, on topics ranging from media and culture to politics and religion. He is the founder/publisher of the news and culture portal, Bullypulpit.com. His first book, The Rock & Roll Rebellion  was published in 1999, followed by Faith, God & Rock 'n' Roll  in 2003. In 2009 Joseph announced a partnership between his imprint, Bully! Pulpit Books and Midpoint Trade Books, to bring both Joseph's own books and those he edits to market. The first book in the arrangement was The Lion, The Professor & The Movies: Narnia's Journey To The Big Screen which was released in 2010. His book Rock Gets Religion was published in 2018.

Awards and recognition

At the 36th annual GMA Music Awards, Joseph won an award in the Special Event Album of the Year category for his work as producer of the Inspired By Soundtrack for The Passion of the Christ: Songs

Filmography
 2023 Reagan (Producer)
 2019  No Safe Spaces (producer)
 2012 Doonby (Producer)
 2009 Japan: In Search Of The Dream (Producer)
 2006 Amazing Grace (development)
 2005 The Chronicles of Narnia: The Lion, the Witch and the Wardrobe (development) (marketing)
 2004 Ray (development) (marketing)
 2004 Cupid (producer)
 2004 The Bridge (co-producer)

Bibliography

2018 Rock Gets Religion (Bully! Pulpit Books)
2010 The Lion, The Professor & The Movies: Narnia's Journey To The Big Screen, Bully! Pulpit Books/Midpoint Trade Books 
2003 Faith, God, and Rock 'n' Roll, Sanctuary Publishing/Baker Books
1999 The Rock & Roll Rebellion, B&H Publishing

External links

Mark Joseph on the Huffington Post
Mark Joseph on Bully!Pulpit
MJM Group
Bully! Pulpit

References

1968 births
Living people
20th-century American writers
21st-century American writers
American film producers
American record producers
Biola University alumni
HuffPost writers and columnists
American music historians
American male non-fiction writers
American television talk show hosts
Writers from Tokyo